Magherafelt is a town and civil parish in County Londonderry, Northern Ireland. It had a population of 8,805 at the 2011 Census. It is the biggest town in the south of the county and is the social, economic and political hub of the area. It is part of Mid-Ulster District.

History 

Magherafelt has been documented as a town since 1425. An earlier name for the area was Teach Fíolta - ‘Fíolta’s (monastic) house’. This would suggest that there was a monastic settlement here under the leadership of Fíolta. The site of the medieval parish church may be marked by the ruins of a later church and graveyard at the bottom of Broad Street.

The Salters Company of London was granted the surrounding lands in South Londonderry in the seventeenth century as part of the Plantation of Ulster. Subsequently, the town began to take on its current shape with a central diamond forming the heart of the town.

During The Troubles in the late 20th century, 11 people were killed in or near Magherafelt in connection with the conflict.

Governance
The town had its own Magherafelt District Council. On 1 April 2015, it was merged with Cookstown District Council and Dungannon and South Tyrone Borough Council under local government reorganisation in Northern Ireland becoming Mid-Ulster District Council. The Mid Ulster District Council has 40 councillors of which five are elected by the electors of Magherafelt.  In the 2019 Mid Ulster District Council election, the five elected councillors included two members of Sinn Féin, one member of the SDLP and two members of the Democratic Unionist Party.

It is located within the Mid Ulster (Assembly constituency) in the Northern Ireland Assembly and the Mid Ulster (UK Parliament constituency). The current MP is Francie Molloy of Sinn Féin.

Notable buildings

At the foot of Broad Street is located The Bridewell.  This building previously housed the town's court-house and gaol (jail).  The name Bridewell is a common name in Britain and Ireland for a prison (see Bridewell Palace). It has since been refurbished and now houses the town's library and tourist centre.

Churches
 Catholic Church of Our Lady of the Assumption (1882)
 St. Swithin's Church of Ireland (1858) 
 First Presbyterian Church (1738)
 Calvary Free Presbyterian Church (1978)
 Magherafelt Baptist Church (2007)

Transport

Road
Magherafelt lies on the A31 route which connects the south west of the province (Tyrone, Fermanagh) to the north east (Coleraine, Ballymena etc.). Traffic from north and south used to pass through the town centre frequently leading to considerable congestion. In the 1970s a bypass was proposed route which was eventually funded in 2013 and completed in 2016.  The road is a single-carriageway around the eastern edge of the town connecting Moneymore Road and Castledawson Road. The old road through the town became the B40 when the road opened.

Rail
Magherafelt railway station opened on 10 November 1856, shut for passenger traffic on 28 August 1950 and shut altogether on 1 October 1959.

Schools

Thera are seven primary schools serving the area. Local secondary schools include St. Mary's Grammar School, Saint Pius X College,  Rainey Endowed School, Sperrin Integrated College and Magherafelt High School.

Sport

Magherafelt has several sporting teams, including Magherafelt Reds, O'Donovan Rossa Magherafelt GAC, the Rainey Old Boys Rugby Club and Magherafelt Sky Blues F.C. There is also the Mid Ulster Athletic Club, the Mid Ulster Swimming Club and the Magherafelt District Motorclub.

Demography
At the 2011 census, there were 8,805 people living in Magherafelt. This represented an increase of 5.2% on the Census 2001 population of 8,372. Of these:
21.75% were aged under 16 years and 12.44% were aged 65 and over
48.65% of the population were male and 51.35% were female
59.73% were from a Catholic background and 35.67% were from a Protestant or other Christian background
5.65% of people aged 16–74 were unemployed.
36.98% indicated that they had a British national identity, 33.87% had an Irish national identity, and 30.45% had a Northern Irish national identity.

Notable people
 Robert Hagan (born 1794) – naval officer and abolitionist
 Joseph Burns (1906 – ) – Ulster Unionist member of the Parliament of Northern Ireland from 1960 – 1973
 Peter Doherty (1913 – 1990) – former footballer and manager of Northern Ireland
 Sir James Starritt, KCVO (1914-2000) – Deputy Commissioner of Police of the Metropolis (London Metropolitan Police) from 1972 to 1975
 Monsignor Laurence Higgins (1928 – 2016) – former Vicar General of the Diocese of St. Petersburg, Florida and founder of St. Lawrence Catholic Parish in Tampa, Florida
 Harry Gregg (1932 – 2020) – former Manchester United and Northern Ireland goalkeeper
 Willie McCrea (born 1948) – politician and a member of the Democratic Unionist Party
 Paul Charles (born 1949) – novelist, music promoter and talent agent
 Kenny Shiels (born 1956) – former manager of Derry City
 Philip Maini, FRS FMedSci FRSB (born 1959) – mathematician
 Aaron Hughes (born 1979) – former professional Association Footballer
 Barry Gillis (born 1980) – current Derry Gaelic footballer
 Laura Pyper (born 1980) – actress (Hex, Reign of Fire and Headrush)
 Terry McFlynn (born 1981) – a retired football player.
 Mickey Niblock – former Derry Gaelic footballer
 Jonathan Anderson (born 1984) – fashion designer
 Dean Shiels (born 1985) – professional association football player

See also
List of civil parishes of County Londonderry
List of localities in Northern Ireland by population

References

External links

Magherafelt Council Website (archived 2001)
Culture Northern Ireland (archived 2007)

 
Towns in County Londonderry
Civil parishes of County Londonderry
Mid-Ulster District